Daniel Abou Sleiman is a Lebanese international rugby footballer who plays as a full-back or on the .

Abou Sleiman is a Lebanese rugby league international. 
Abou-Sleiman has played first grade rugby union in Japan. He has previously played for Cabramatta Two Blues and the Wests Tigers in the NSW Cup.

References

External links
(archived by web.archive.org) Personal Training profile
(archived by web.archive.org) Statistics at rlwc2017.com

1991 births
Living people
Cabramatta Two Blues players
Lebanese rugby league players
Lebanon national rugby league team players
Newtown Jets NSW Cup players
Rugby league fullbacks
Rugby league wingers
Wests Tigers NSW Cup players